Cuando los hijos regresan is a 2017 Mexican comedy film directed by Hugo Lara Chávez, from a screenplay by Claudia González-Rubio. The film is inspired in the 1941 film titled Cuando los hijos se van by Juan Bustillo Oro, and in turn in the 1968 version of the same name of Julián Soler. It stars Fernando Luján, along to Cecilia Suárez, Irene Azuela, Carmen Maura, and Erick Elías. The film premiered on 22 December 2017 in Mexico.

Cast 
 Fernando Luján as Manuel
 Cecilia Suárez as Carlota
 Carmen Maura as Adelina
 Irene Azuela as Daniela
 Diana Bovio as Rosita
 Erick Elias as Chico
 Esmeralda Pimentel as Violeta
 Francisco de la Reguera as Rafis
 Roberto Quijano as Topoy
 Tina Romero as Lulú
 Tomás Rojas as Gilberto
 Anabel Ferreira as Lucía

References

External links 
 

Mexican comedy films
Remakes of Mexican films